Simon Willard (1605–1676) family:

Selected lineage 
The following selected lineage is primarily paternal, hence the same surnames. Note that, with respect to traversalness (breadth and depth), the tree does not aim for comprehensiveness in terms to breadth.

See also 
 Willard InterContinental Washington, established just prior to the Civil War by Henry "Harry" C. Augustus Willard (1822–1909), 5th great-grandson (8th generation descendant) of Simon Willard.
 Archibald MacNeal Willard (1838–1918), American painter, 5th great-grandson (8th generation descendant) of Simon Willard
 Ashbel Parsons Willard (1820–1860), Indiana state senator, 12th Indiana Lieutenant Governor, and 11th Indiana Governor, 3rd great-grandson (6th generation descendant) of Simon Willard

Bibliography

Notes

References linked to notes 

  ; .

  ;  & .
<li>

  ; .
<li>
<li>
<li>
<li>
<li>
<li>

<li>

<li>

<li>
<li>
<li>
<li>
<li>
<li>
<li>

<li>
<li>

<li>

  .
  ; .
  ; .

Descendants of individuals